Hilal Hemed Hilal, (born 12 July 1994 in Sharjah) is a Tanzanian swimmer. He competed in the 50 m butterfly, 50 m, 100 m freestyle, 50 m, 100 m backstroke and 50 m breaststroke events at the 2012 FINA World Swimming Championships (25 m). Hilal also took part in the 50 m freestyle and 50 m butterfly events at the 2013 World Aquatics Championships. He ranked 49th at the Rio 2016 Summer Olympics in 50 m freestyle.

References

Living people
1994 births
Tanzanian male swimmers
Swimmers at the 2014 Commonwealth Games
Commonwealth Games competitors for Tanzania
Swimmers at the 2016 Summer Olympics
Olympic swimmers of Tanzania
Male backstroke swimmers
Male butterfly swimmers
Male breaststroke swimmers
Tanzanian male freestyle swimmers
Swimmers at the 2015 African Games
African Games competitors for Tanzania
People from Dar es Salaam